Slavonia-Baranja Croatian Party ( or SBHS) was a regional political party in Croatia.

It was founded in 1992 in Slavonia. It was usually allied with Social Democratic Party of Croatia.

From 1995 to 2003 it was represented in the Croatian Parliament.

At the 2003 Croatian parliamentary election, the alliance of the Croatian People's Party (HNS) with the Alliance of Primorje - Gorski Kotar and the Slavonia-Baranja Croatian Party won 8.0% of the popular vote and 11 out of 151 seats, 10 seats of them occupied by the HNS. None of these seats were for the SBHS, so it lost its seat.

In May 2008 it merged into HDSSB.

Electoral history

Legislative

References

Defunct political parties in Croatia
Political parties disestablished in 2008
Political parties established in 1992